Goszczyno may refer to the following places:
Goszczyno, Masovian Voivodeship (east-central Poland)
Goszczyno, Puck County in Pomeranian Voivodeship (north Poland)
Goszczyno, Słupsk County in Pomeranian Voivodeship (north Poland)